
This is a list of aircraft in numerical order of manufacturer followed by alphabetical order beginning with 'Mb'.

Mb

MBB 
(Messerschmitt-Bölkow-Blohm)
 MBB 223 Flamingo
 MBB Lampyridae
 MBB Bö 102
 MBB Bö 103
 MBB Bö 105
 MBB Bö 106
 MBB Bö 107
 MBB Bö 108
 MBB Bö 115
 MBB Bö 208 Junior
 MBB Bö 209 Monsun
 MBB HFB 320 Hansa-Jet
 MBB Fan Ranger
 MBB/Kawasaki BK 117
 MBB-Kawasaki CH-143
 MBB MHK-101

References

Further reading

External links 

 List Of Aircraft (M)

fr:Liste des aéronefs (I-M)